Mutisia is a genus of flowering plant in the tribe Mutisieae within the family Asteraceae. Mutisia has been named after José Celestino Mutis. It comprises about sixty species which can be found along the entire length of the Andes and in southern Brazil, Paraguay, Uruguay and northern Argentina.

Species accepted by the Plants of the World Online as of December 2022: 

 formerly included
see Gongylolepis
 Mutisia obovata - Gongylolepis martiana

See also
 Mutisianthol

References

External links
 

 
Asteraceae genera
Taxonomy articles created by Polbot